Namco Museum Vol. 2 is a video game compilation developed and published by Namco for the PlayStation in 1996.

Gameplay
Namco Museum Vol. 2 includes the original Namco arcade hits Super Pac-Man, Gaplus, Xevious, Mappy, Grobda, and Dragon Buster. Although this is only true of the NTSC and PAL versions of the game, as the Japanese version contain the early Namco games Cutie Q and a secret Hidden game Bomb Bee.

Reception
Next Generation reviewed the PlayStation version of the game, rating it two stars out of five, and stated that "Only the most die-hard classic game collectors will want this disc, and they'll only want half of it.  Namco should more closely consider the future line-up in its classic series."

Reviews
All Game Guide - 1998
Electronic Gaming Monthly - Nov, 1996
GameSpot - Dec 13, 1996
NowGamer - Nov 01, 1996
IGN - Nov 25, 1996

References

1996 video games
Bandai Namco video game compilations
Namco games
PlayStation (console) games
PlayStation (console)-only games
Video games developed in Japan